The 2005 Challenge Bell was a tennis tournament played on indoor carpet courts at the PEPS de l'Université Laval in Quebec City in Canada that was part of Tier III of the 2005 WTA Tour. It was the 13th edition of the Challenge Bell, and was held from October 31 through November 6, 2005. Amy Frazier won the singles title.

Champions

Singles

 Amy Frazier def.  Sofia Arvidsson, 6–1, 7–5
It was Frazier's only title of the year and the 8th of her career.

Doubles

 Anastasia Rodionova /  Elena Vesnina def.  Līga Dekmeijere /  Ashley Harkleroad, 6–7(4–7), 6–4, 6–2
It was Rodionova's only title of the year and the 1st of her career. It was Vesnina's only title of the year and the 1st of her career.

External links
Official website

Challenge Bell
Tournoi de Québec
Challenge Bell
2000s in Quebec City
Challenge Bell
Challenge Bell
Challenge Bell